Mònica Ramírez Abella (born 27 December 1993 in Escaldes-Engordany) is an Andorran swimmer. She competed at the 2012 Summer Olympics in the Women's 100 metre backstroke, finishing in 42nd place in the heats, failing to qualify for the semifinals. She also competed in the 50 m freestyle event at the 2013 World Aquatics Championships.

In 2019, she won two bronze medals at the 2019 Games of the Small States of Europe held in Budva, Montenegro.

Notes

References

External links
 
 
 

1993 births
Living people
Andorran female swimmers
Female backstroke swimmers
Olympic swimmers of Andorra
Swimmers at the 2012 Summer Olympics
Mediterranean Games competitors for Andorra
Swimmers at the 2009 Mediterranean Games
Swimmers at the 2013 Mediterranean Games
Swimmers at the 2018 Mediterranean Games
Swimmers at the 2022 Mediterranean Games